Nahr Ibrahim is a town in the Byblos District of  Keserwan-Jbeil Governorate, Lebanon. It is 47 kilometers north of Beirut. Nahr Ibrahim has an average elevation of 220 meters above sea level and a total land area of 341 hectares. The village has one public school, which enrolled 44 students in 2008 and a French university operating by the French and Lebanese governments Conservatoire National des arts et métiers cnam which enrolled 2913 students as of May 2017.the village include a large industrial area (papers, woods, cables, oil, oxygen,drugs, milk and cheese) Its inhabitants are predominantly Maronite Catholics.

References

Populated places in Byblos District
Maronite Christian communities in Lebanon